Finding Agnes is a 2020 Filipino drama film directed by Marla Ancheta and starring Jelson Bay, Sue Ramirez and Sandy Andolong. The film revolves around a successful businessman who flies to Morocco after the death of his estranged mother to fulfill his mother's final wishes along with her adopted daughter.

Cast 
 Jelson Bay as Virgilio "Brix" Rivero
 Sue Ramirez as Cathy Duvera
 Sandy Andolong as Agnes Rivero
 Roxanne Guinoo as Young Agnes Rivero
 Hannah Ledesma as Violet
 Yuan Francisco as Young Virgilio "Brix" Rivero
 Cheska Iñigo

Production
Finding Agnes was directed by Marla Ancheta and written by Aileen Kessop and was produced under Mavx Productions.
Filming for Finding Agnes mostly took place in Marrakesh, Morocco in 2019, prior to the COVID-19 pandemic prevailing at the time of the film's release. Initially the script called for a romantic comedy story but Ancheta had the script revised to a "personal journey" story of a person with some light drama elements.

Release
Finding Agnes premiered globally on November 30, 2020 through Netflix

References

External links
 
 

2020 films
2020 drama films
Filipino-language Netflix original films
Films shot in Morocco
Films set in Morocco